is the largest bank in Japan. It was established on January 1, 2006, following the merger of the Bank of Tokyo-Mitsubishi, Ltd. and UFJ Bank Ltd. MUFG is one of the three so-called Japanese "megabanks" (along with SMBC and Mizuho). As such, it is considered a systemically important bank by the Financial Stability Board.

The bank serves as the core retail, corporate, and investment banking arm of the Mitsubishi UFJ Financial Group. Its traditional client base is made up of Japanese corporates, but overseas corporate lending increased 35% in the nine months to December 31, 2011.

As of June 23, 2019, Mitsubishi UFJ Financial Group / MUFG Bank was ranked as the largest bank in Japan and the fourth largest in the world.

The bank's head office is in Marunouchi, Chiyoda, Tokyo, and it has 772 other offices in Japan and 76 offices overseas.

History

Formation
MUFG Bank is the product of three bank mergers that occurred between 1996 and 2006.

Mitsubishi Bank was founded in 1880 by a former samurai, Iwasaki Yatarō, and was a core member of the Mitsubishi Group of companies. It merged with The Bank of Tokyo in 1996 to form , which at that point was the world's largest bank in terms of total assets. In 1998, upon merger of the then second and third largest Swiss banks, Union Bank of Switzerland and Swiss Bank Corporation, the newly created UBS AG became the second largest in the world at the time, behind only the Bank of Tokyo-Mitsubishi. The Bank of Tokyo had historically focused on foreign exchange business since its foundation as the Yokohama Specie Bank in 1880, while Mitsubishi had had a stronger focus on domestic corporate and retail banking. Both banks were relatively healthy in the wake of the Japanese asset price bubble.

Until the Tokyo-Mitsubishi merger took place in 1996, Sanwa Bank, which was based in Osaka and was the anchor of the Sanwa Group keiretsu, had been considered the strongest bank in Japan, and it had aimed to be the world's largest bank during the "bubble era". By 2000, however, Sanwa was the fourth largest bank in Japan. It entered into merger talks with two other large banks, Asahi Bank and Tokai Bank, to create the world's third-largest bank by assets. Asahi (now part of Resona Holdings) pulled out of these talks later that year. By 2001, The Toyo Trust & Banking Co. had been added to the merger group and the combined company was to be called United Financial Holdings of Japan. The merger was completed in 2002 and the new bank was officially named . UFJ was headquartered in Nagoya, the historical headquarters of Tokai Bank. During its short life, it was plagued by bad debt problems and by infighting between the employees of its predecessor companies.

The holding companies of BTM and UFJ agreed to merge in 2005, forming Japan's largest bank by assets and market capitalization. This led to litigation between BTM and Sumitomo Trust & Banking Co., which had previously agreed to an alliance with UFJ under which it would take over UFJ's trust banking operations. BTM and UFJ settled their dispute for 2.5 billion yen in late 2006. The merger of the two bank holding companies was completed on October 1, 2005, creating the Mitsubishi UFJ Financial Group. The core banking units of MTFG and UFJ Holdings, the Bank of Tokyo-Mitsubishi, Ltd. and UFJ Bank Ltd., respectively, continued to operate separately until January 1, 2006, when the two units combined to form The Bank of Tokyo-Mitsubishi UFJ, Ltd. (BTMU)

Post-merger operations

Mitsubishi Bank and the Bank of Tokyo each had significant banking subsidiaries in California (Bank of California and Union Bank respectively) before their merger. At the time of the merger, these U.S. banks also merged to form UnionBanCal Corporation. BTM listed UnionBanCal on the New York Stock Exchange in 1999. In 2008, BTMU purchased all of the outstanding shares of UnionBanCal. BTMU moved its New York-based banking operations to Union Bank and renamed the company MUFG Union Bank in 2014.

BTMU was investigated by New York banking regulators over its role in routing payments for Iranian customers through its New York branch in violation of U.S. sanctions. BTMU settled with the state for $250 million in 2013. A second settlement was reached for $315 million in 2014 after it was found that PricewaterhouseCoopers had altered an investigation report on the issue; PwC itself was fined $25 million in relation to the matter.

This name change aligned the bank name with the holding company name, Mitsubishi UFJ Financial Group (MUFG), removing "Tokyo" from the name.

Holdings
UnionBanCal Corporation (approx 63% in Feb 2005; 68% in 2004; 100% in 2008)
Chong Hing Bank (9.66%)
Morgan Stanley (22.41%). On September 29, 2008, Mitsubishi UFJ Financial Group announced that it would acquire a shareholding in Morgan Stanley for US$9 billion. In the midst of the October 2008 stock market crash, concerns over the completion of the Mitsubishi deal caused a dramatic fall in Morgan Stanley's stock price to levels last seen in 1994. Morgan Stanley's share price recovered considerably after Mitsubishi UFJ closed the deal on October 14, 2008.
 The payment from MUFG was supposed to be wired electronically; however, because it needed to be made on an emergency basis on Columbus Day when banks were closed in the US, MUFG cut a US$9 billion physical check, the largest amount written via physical check at the time. The physical check was accepted by Robert A. Kindler, Global Head of Mergers and Acquisitions and Vice Chairman of Morgan Stanley, at the offices of Wachtell Lipton.
Bank of Ayudhya (76.88% on January 5, 2015; 72% on December 19, 2013)
Bank Danamon (92.47%)

References

External links

  
 
 Official site MUFG (Americas)
  Wiki collection of bibliographic works on The Bank of Tokyo-Mitsubishi UFJ

Banks of Japan
Mitsubishi companies
Mitsubishi UFJ Financial Group
Systemically important financial institutions
Financial services companies based in Tokyo
Japanese companies established in 2006
Banks established in 2006
Japanese brands